The eighth edition of the European Race Walking Cup took place in the French city of Metz on Sunday May 24, 2009.

Complete results were published. The junior events are documented on the World Junior Athletics History webpages.  Medal winners were published on the Athletics Weekly website,

Timetable
All times are Central European Time (UTC+1)

Medallists

Abbreviations
All times shown are in hours:minutes:seconds

Men's results

20 km walk

Team (20 km Men)

50 km walk

Team (50 km Men)

Junior 10 km walk

Team (10 km Junior Men)

Women's results

20 km walk

Team (20 km Women)

Junior 10 km walk
U-20 competition; only top three listed

Team (10 km Junior Women)

Participation
The participation of 228 athletes (140 men/88 women) from 26 countries is reported.

 (12)
 (1)
 (6)
 (2)
 (5)
 (17)
 (7)
 (8)
 (13)
 (9)
 (14)
 (5)
 (11)
 (1)
 (2)
 (14)
 (13)
 (7)
 (18)
 (7)
 (18)
 (4)
 (4)
 (5)
 (18)
 (7)

References

External links
european-athletics

2009
Race Walking
Race Walking
European Race Walking Cup
International athletics competitions hosted by France